Lynn Davies CBE (born 20 May 1942) is a Welsh former track and field athlete who specialised in the long jump. He was the 1964 Olympic champion in the event. He was born  in Nantymoel near Bridgend and was a member of the Cardiff Amateur Athletic Club.

He finished ninth in 1968, having been flag bearer at the opening ceremony. In 1964 he also competed in the 100 metres and 4×100 metres contests. He was 18th in the 1972 Olympic long jump, his selection being something of a surprise at the time.

Outside the Olympics, Davies was the 1966 European champion in the long jump and was the silver medallist three years later. He was also twice the Commonwealth Games champion, winning titles in 1966 and 1970 (becoming the first man to win that title two times).

Davies was twice a winner of the BBC Wales Sports Personality of the Year award, taking the honour in 1964 and 1966. After retiring from competitions in 1973 he became technical director of Canadian athletics until 1976 and later prepared the British team for the Moscow Olympics.

Davies was appointed a Commander of the Order of the British Empire (CBE) in the 2006 Birthday Honours "for services to Sport, in particular Athletics." He had previously been appointed a Member of the same order (MBE) in the 1967 New Year Honours for services to athletics. He was elected unopposed as President of the UK Athletics Members Council for a further four years following the close of nominations.

References 

1942 births
Living people
Sportspeople from Bridgend County Borough
Welsh male long jumpers
Welsh male sprinters
Olympic athletes of Great Britain
Olympic gold medallists for Great Britain
Athletes (track and field) at the 1964 Summer Olympics
Athletes (track and field) at the 1968 Summer Olympics
Athletes (track and field) at the 1972 Summer Olympics
Medalists at the 1964 Summer Olympics
Welsh Olympic medallists
Commonwealth Games gold medallists for Wales
Commonwealth Games medallists in athletics
Athletes (track and field) at the 1962 British Empire and Commonwealth Games
Athletes (track and field) at the 1966 British Empire and Commonwealth Games
Athletes (track and field) at the 1970 British Commonwealth Games
European Athletics Championships medalists
Commanders of the Order of the British Empire
Olympic gold medalists in athletics (track and field)
Universiade medalists in athletics (track and field)
Universiade silver medalists for Great Britain
Medalists at the 1965 Summer Universiade
Medallists at the 1966 British Empire and Commonwealth Games
Medallists at the 1970 British Commonwealth Games